is a district located in Iburi and Shiribeshi Subprefectures in Hokkaido, Japan.

Towns and villages

Iburi Subprefecture
Tōyako
Toyoura

Shiribeshi Subprefecture
Kimobetsu
Kutchan
Kyōgoku
Makkari
Niseko
Rusutsu

History 
1869: Upon the creation of 11 provinces and 86 Districts in Hokkaido, Abuta District is assigned to Iburi Province.
1897: Placed under Muroran Subprefecture (renamed Iburi in 1922).
1899: Kutchan transferred to Iwanai Subprefecture (became part of Shiribeshi in 1910).
1910: Shiribeshi Subprefecture forms from the merger of Iwanai, Suttsu and Otaru Subprefectures.  Part of Abuta District incorporated.
March 27, 2006: the towns of Abuta and Tōya, both of Iburi Subprefecture, merged to form the new town of Tōyako.
2007" The 34th G8 summit was announced to take place in Tōyako.

References

Districts in Hokkaido